This is a list of 21st-century classical composers, sortable by name, year of birth and year of death.

The list includes composers who have made classical music since 2001. The 21st century is defined by the calendar rather than by any unifying characteristics of musical style or attitude, and is therefore not an era of the same order as the classical or romantic. However, the century to date can be considered a continuation of the postmodern era that began during the 20th century and differs from the earlier modernist era in matters of attitude more than style.


List

See also
 Contemporary classical music
 List of acousmatic-music composers
 List of 20th-century classical composers

References

External links
American Composer Timeline
The Living Composers Project
Art of the States: Search by composer, American composers
temp’óra – international network dedicated to the promotion of contemporary music. Data bases with thousands of links all over the world.

 List
Composers
21st-century Classical
Classical composers